Pathway to Glory: Ikusa Islands is a tactical turn-based game for the Nokia N-Gage, published by Nokia and developed by Ubisoft RedLynx, released in late 2005. The game is a sequel to the original Pathway to Glory.

Story
Commanded by an old navy veteran McDouglas, a squad of allied soldiers take on the horrors of the Pacific Theatre. Only their strong ties to each other and to the seasoned veteran commander can keep them alive.

Ikusa Islands can be played in single-player and multiplayer mode, using either hotseat, N-Gage Arena or a local Bluetooth connection.

External links 
 List of Pathway to Glory: Ikusa Islands reviews at GameRankings

2005 video games
Europe-exclusive video games
N-Gage games
Turn-based tactics video games
Video games developed in Finland
World War II video games
RedLynx games
Nokia games
Multiplayer and single-player video games